Calybites quadrisignella is a moth of the family Gracillariidae. It is found in Central and Eastern Europe.

The larvae feed on Rhamnus catharticus, Rhamnus frangula, Rhamnus imeritinus and Rhamnus saxatilis tinctorius. They mine the leaves of their host plant. The mine starts as a lower-surface, epidermal corridor, widening into a small full depth blotch in a vein axle. Most frass is concentrated in the axle. Older larvae live freely within a rolled leaf margin.

References

Gracillariinae
Moths of Europe
Moths of Asia
Moths described in 1839